(6 December 1952 – 4 April 2010) was a Japanese manga artist.  Satō was a member of the Post Year 24 Group, a group of female manga artists considered influential in the development of shōjo manga. She also wrote under the pen name .  She made her professional debut in 1977 with the publication of Koi wa Ajinomono!? in Bessatsu Shōjo Comic. Her definitive works include Yumemiru Wakusei (The Dreaming Planet) and One Zero. Her stories were usually serious science fiction drawn in a "subdued" style.  Sato regards her interest in science fiction from the patience and thorough answers of her father when she was young and asking "Why?" to everything.  Her science fiction influences include Isaac Asimov, Cordwainer Smith and James Tiptree Jr.  A major influence on her work Yumemiru Wakusei was the film Lawrence of Arabia.

Satō became an assistant to Moto Hagio and Keiko Takemiya in 1972, and she continued to work as an assistant until the demands of her own works prevented her from doing so.

Her short story, The Changeling, in addition to being published in the English-language anthology Four Shōjo Stories, was serialised in Animerica. Satō died from brain cancer in Tome, Miyagi, on 4 April 2010, aged 57.

Works
 (1979, Kisōtengaisha) (1992, reprint plus one new story, Shinchosha) 
 (1980, Shinshokan) 
 (1982–1984, serialized in Petit Flower, Shogakukan) (1996,  bunkoban reprint, Shogakukan)
 (1983, Shinshokan)
 (1984, Shinshokan) inspired by Ship of Fools by Sebastian Brant 
 (1984, Shinshokan)
 (1985, Shinshokan) 
 (1985–1986, Shogakukan) (1996, bunkoban reprint, Shogakukan)
 (1987, Shogakukan) 
 (1987, Hakusensha) 
 (1988, Hakusensha)
 (1989, Shogakukan) 
 (1988, Shinshokan)
 (1989, Shogakukan)
 (1995, Shogakukan)
 (1999, serialized in Petit Flower, Shogakukan)
Majutsushi Sagashi (魔術師さがし) (2000, Shogakukan)

Anthologies
These are anthology works in which one or more stories by Satō appeared:
 (1982, Sanrio)
 (1991, Shinchosha)
 (1991, Shinchosha)
Four Shōjo Stories (1996, Viz Media)

References

External links
佐藤史生データベース 

1950 births
2010 deaths
Deaths from brain tumor
Manga artists from Miyagi Prefecture